Denis Banks (born 16 June 1959) is a former Australian rules footballer who played for the Collingwood Football Club in the VFL/AFL.

Banks was from East Reservoir and played as a centre-half-forward, but injuries prevented him from developing into a key position player. He made his debut in 1979 and played in the losing Grand Final side for the Magpies. In 1984 he won a spot in the VFL's Team of the Year.

Banks was nearing the end of his career in 1990, but played another season and won a premiership medal in the drought-breaking Grand Final for Collingwood. He retired in 1991, a year after premiership success. Banks was inducted into the Collingwood Hall of Fame in 2007.

External links

1959 births
Living people
Collingwood Football Club players
Collingwood Football Club Premiership players
Australian rules footballers from Victoria (Australia)
One-time VFL/AFL Premiership players